Shobnall is a settlement and civil parish located in Staffordshire, England. It covers an area located in the west of Burton upon Trent. The population of Shobnall taken at the 2011 census was 5,071.

See also
Listed buildings in Shobnall

References 

Villages in Staffordshire
Civil parishes in Staffordshire
Burton upon Trent